Kamphuis is a Dutch toponymic surname. Meaning "house on a fenced/enclosed field", it may have a generic origin, or refer specifically to one of a number of hamlets with that name. It is most common in the provinces of Gelderland and Overijssel. Among variants are Camphues, Kamphuijs and plural forms like Kamphuijsen.  People with this name include:

Esmé Kamphuis (born 1983), Dutch heptathlete and bobsledder
Johannes Camphuys (1634–1695), Dutch Governor-General of the Dutch East Indies from 1684 to 1691
Vincent Kamphuis (born 1980), Dutch darts player
Oude Kamphuis
Niels Oude Kamphuis (born 1977), Dutch football midfielder

See also
Kamphuis Field at Liberty Softball Stadium, named after softball pitcher Dwayne Kamphuis
Camphuysen, family of 17th-century Dutch painters
Jan Kamphuijsen (1760–1841), Dutch painter

References

Dutch-language surnames
Toponymic surnames